John Westbrook may refer to:
 John Westbrook (Pennsylvania politician) (1789–1852), Democratic member of the U.S. House of Representatives from Pennsylvania
 John Wesley Westbrook (1880–1934), Canadian official and political figure
 John Westbrook (actor) (1922–1989), English actor
 John Westbrook (American football) (1947–1983), first African American to play football in the Southwest Conference

See also
John Westbrook Hornbeck (1804–1848), Whig member of the U.S. House of Representatives from Pennsylvania